Qızılavar (also, Kyzylavar) is a village and municipality in the Masally Rayon of Azerbaijan.  It has a population of 3,600.

References 

Populated places in Masally District